Antrim is a former UK Parliament constituency in Ireland. It was a two-member constituency and existed in two periods, 1801–1885 and 1922–1950.

Boundaries 

From 1801 until 1885, the constituency consisted of the whole of County Antrim, excluding the parts in the Parliamentary borough constituencies of Belfast, Carrickfergus and Lisburn.  From 1885 to 1922, the constituency was split between the divisions of East Antrim, Mid Antrim, North Antrim and South Antrim.

From 1922 until 1950, the constituency consisted of the Administrative county of Antrim, that is the whole of County Antrim excluding the part in the City of Belfast.  In 1950 the county was split, between the divisions of Antrim North and Antrim South.

Members of Parliament

MPs 1801–1885 
Key to parties: C Conservative, L Liberal, NP no party identified, T Tory, U Unionist, W Whig. Changes of party name in 1832 are indicated i.e. (T,C) and (W,L).

Notes:
 (1) Earl of Yarmouth (1800–1870) was known as Viscount Beauchamp until 17 June 1822.
 (2) Earl of Belfast became W by 1831 and is categorised as L from 1832.
 (3) Earl of Yarmouth (1843–1912) was known as Hugh de Grey Seymour until 25 August 1870.

MPs 1922–1950

Elections 
In two-member elections the bloc voting system was used. Voters could cast a vote for one or two candidates, as they chose. The two candidates with the largest number of votes were elected.  In by-elections, to fill a single seat, the first past the post system applied.

There was no election in 1801. The representatives of the county in the former Parliament of Ireland became members of the 1st Parliament of the United Kingdom.

After 1832, when registration of voters was introduced, a turnout figure is given for contested elections. In two-member elections, when the exact number of participating voters is unknown, this is calculated by dividing the number of votes by two. To the extent that voters did not use both their votes this will be an underestimate of turnout. If the electorate figure is unknown the last known electorate figure is used to provide an estimate of turnout.

Where a party had more than one candidate in one or both of a pair of successive elections change is calculated for each individual candidate, otherwise change is based on the party vote.

Elections in the 1940s 

 Seat vacant at dissolution (Death of Campbell)

Elections in the 1930s

Elections in the 1920s

Elections in the 1880s

Elections in the 1870s

Elections in the 1860s 

 Caused by Seymour's death.
 Note: Hugh Seymour was known as the Earl of Yarmouth from 25 August 1870.

 Caused by Seymour's appointment as Lord Commissioner of the Admiralty.

 Caused by Upton's succession to the peerage, becoming Viscount Templetown.

Elections in the 1850s 

 

 Caused by Pakenham's death

Elections in the 1840s 

 Caused by Irving's death

 Caused by O'Neill's succession to the peerage, becoming 3rd Viscount O'Neill

Elections in the 1830s

Elections in the 1820s

Elections in the 1810s

Elections in the 19th century

References 

 The Parliaments of England by Henry Stooks Smith (1st edition published in three volumes 1844–50), second edition edited (in one volume) by F. W. S. Craig (Political Reference Publications 1973)
 Parliamentary Election Results in Ireland, 1801–1922, edited by B. M. Walker (Royal Irish Academy 1978)
 Who's Who of British members of parliament: Volume I 1832–1885, edited by M. Stenton (The Harvester Press 1976)
 Who's Who of British members of parliament: Volume III 1919–1945, edited by M. Stenton and S. Lees (The Harvester Press 1979)
 British Parliamentary Election Results 1918–1949, compiled and edited by F. W. S. Craig (The Macmillan Press 1977)
 

Dáil constituencies in Northern Ireland (historic)
Westminster constituencies in County Antrim (historic)
Constituencies of the Parliament of the United Kingdom established in 1801
Constituencies of the Parliament of the United Kingdom disestablished in 1885
Constituencies of the Parliament of the United Kingdom established in 1922
Constituencies of the Parliament of the United Kingdom disestablished in 1950
1801 establishments in Ireland
1885 disestablishments in Ireland
1922 establishments in Northern Ireland
1950 disestablishments in Northern Ireland